Ctenus is a genus of wandering spiders first described by Charles Athanase Walckenaer in 1805. It is widely distributed, from South America through Africa to East Asia. Little is known about the toxic potential of the genus Ctenus; however, Ctenus medius has been shown to share some toxic properties with Phoneutria nigriventer, such as proteolytic, hyaluronidase and phospholipase activities, in addition to producing hyperalgesia and edema. The venom of C. medius also interferes with the complement system in concentrations in which the venom of P. nigriventer is inactive, indicating that some species in the genus may have a medically significant venom. The venom of C. medius interferes with the complement component 3 (C3) of the complement system; it affects the central factor of the cascades of the complement, and interferes with the lytic activity of this system, which causes stronger activation and consumption of the complement components. Unlike C. medius, the venom of P. nigriventer does not interfere with lytic activity.

Species
 it contains 157 species:

C. abditus Arts, 1912 – Congo, Tanzania
C. adustus (Keyserling, 1877) – Colombia
C. agroecoides (Thorell, 1881) – Australia (Queensland)
C. albofasciatus F. O. Pickard-Cambridge, 1897 – Brazil
C. alienus F. O. Pickard-Cambridge, 1900 – Guatemala
C. amanensis Strand, 1907 – East Africa
C. amphora Mello-Leitão, 1930 – Colombia, Brazil, Guyana
C. anahitaeformis Benoit, 1981 – Burundi
C. anahitiformis Strand, 1909 – Brazil
C. auricomus Arts, 1912 – Central, East Africa
C. avidus Bryant, 1948 – Hispaniola
C. bahamensis Strand, 1907 – Bahama Is.
C. bicolor (Bertkau, 1880) – Brazil
C. bigibbosus Benoit, 1980 – Congo
C. bilobatus F. O. Pickard-Cambridge, 1900 – Mexico
C. blumenauensis Strand, 1909 – Brazil
C. bolivicola Strand, 1907 – Bolivia
C. bueanus Strand, 1916 – Cameroon
C. calcaratus F. O. Pickard-Cambridge, 1900 – Guatemala
C. calderitas Alayón, 2002 – Mexico
C. caligineus Arts, 1912 – Central, East Africa
C. captiosus Gertsch, 1935 – USA
C. capulinus (Karsch, 1879) – West, Central Africa
C. catherine Polotow & Brescovit, 2012 – Jamaica
C. cavaticus Arts, 1912 – Congo, Angola
C. celisi Benoit, 1981 – Congo
C. coccineipes Pocock, 1903 – West, Central Africa
C. colombianus Mello-Leitão, 1941 – Colombia
C. colonicus Arts, 1912 – East Africa
C. complicatus Franganillo, 1946 – Cuba
C. constrictus Benoit, 1981 – Congo
C. convexus F. O. Pickard-Cambridge, 1900 – Mexico to Costa Rica
C. cruciatus Franganillo, 1930 – Cuba
C. crulsi Mello-Leitão, 1930 – Brazil
C. darlingtoni Bryant, 1948 – Hispaniola
C. datus Strand, 1909 – Ecuador
C. decemnotatus Simon, 1910 – Guinea-Bissau
C. decorus (Gerstäcker, 1873) – East Africa
C. delesserti (Caporiacco, 1947) – Guyana
C. denticulatus Benoit, 1981 – Congo
C. dilucidus Simon, 1910 – Congo
C. doloensis Caporiacco, 1940 – Ethiopia
C. drassoides (Karsch, 1879) – Colombia
C. dreyeri Strand, 1906 – Cameroon
C. dubius Walckenaer, 1805 (type) – French Guiana
C. efferatus Arts, 1912 – Congo
C. elgonensis Benoit, 1978 – Kenya
C. ellacomei F. O. Pickard-Cambridge, 1902 – Suriname
C. embolus Benoit, 1981 – Congo
C. ensiger F. O. Pickard-Cambridge, 1900 – Mexico
C. esculentus Arts, 1912 – Cameroon, Congo
C. excavatus F. O. Pickard-Cambridge, 1900 – Mexico
C. exlineae Peck, 1981 – USA
C. facetus Arts, 1912 – Congo, East Africa
C. falcatus F. O. Pickard-Cambridge, 1902 – St. Lucia
C. falciformis Benoit, 1981 – Congo
C. falconensis Schenkel, 1953 – Venezuela
C. fasciatus Mello-Leitão, 1943 – Brazil
C. fernandae Brescovit & Simó, 2007 – Brazil
C. feshius Benoit, 1979 – Congo
C. guantanamo (Alayón, 2001) – Cuba
C. gulosus Arts, 1912 – South Africa
C. haina Alayón, 2004 – Hispaniola
C. haitiensis Strand, 1909 – Hispaniola
C. hibernalis Hentz, 1844 – USA
C. hiemalis Bryant, 1948 – Hispaniola
C. holmi Benoit, 1978 – Kenya
C. humilis (Keyserling, 1887) – Nicaragua
C. hygrophilus Benoit, 1977 – Congo
C. idjwiensis Benoit, 1979 – Congo
C. igatu Polotow, Cizauskas & Brescovit, 2022 – Brazil
C. inaja Höfer, Brescovit & Gasnier, 1994 – Colombia, Peru, Bolivia, Brazil
C. insulanus Bryant, 1948 – Hispaniola
C. jaminauensis Mello-Leitão, 1936 – Brazil
C. jaragua Alayón, 2004 – Hispaniola
C. kenyamontanus Benoit, 1978 – Kenya
C. kipatimus Benoit, 1981 – Tanzania
C. lacertus Benoit, 1979 – Congo
C. latitabundus Arts, 1912 – Central, East Africa
C. lejeunei Benoit, 1977 – Congo
C. leonardi Simon, 1910 – West Africa
C. levipes Arts, 1912 – Tanzania
C. longicalcar Kraus, 1955 – El Salvador
C. lubwensis Benoit, 1979 – Congo
C. macellarius Simon, 1910 – Congo
C. maculatus Franganillo, 1931 – Cuba
C. maculisternis Strand, 1909 – Bolivia, Brazil
C. magnificus Arts, 1912 – West Africa
C. malvernensis Petrunkevitch, 1910 – Jamaica
C. manauara Höfer, Brescovit & Gasnier, 1994 – Brazil
C. manni Bryant, 1948 – Hispaniola
C. medius Keyserling, 1891 – Panama, Brazil
C. minimus F. O. Pickard-Cambridge, 1897 – North America
C. minor F. O. Pickard-Cambridge, 1897 – Brazil
C. mitchelli Gertsch, 1971 – Mexico
C. modestus Simon, 1897 – Tanzania (Zanzibar, Kenya)
C. monticola Bryant, 1948 – Hispaniola
C. musosanus Benoit, 1979 – Congo
C. naranjo Alayón, 2004 – Hispaniola
C. nigritarsis (Pavesi, 1897) – Ethiopia
C. nigritus F. O. Pickard-Cambridge, 1897 – Brazil
C. nigrolineatus Berland, 1913 – Ecuador
C. nigromaculatus Thorell, 1899 – Central, West Africa
C. noctuabundus Arts, 1912 – Kenya
C. obscurus (Keyserling, 1877) – Colombia
C. oligochronius Arts, 1912 – East Africa
C. ornatus (Keyserling, 1877) – Brazil
C. ottleyi (Petrunkevitch, 1930) – Puerto Rico
C. paranus Strand, 1909 – Brazil
C. parvoculatus Benoit, 1979 – South Africa
C. parvus (Keyserling, 1877) – Colombia
C. paubrasil Brescovit & Simó, 2007 – Brazil
C. pauloterrai Brescovit & Simó, 2007 – Brazil
C. peregrinus F. O. Pickard-Cambridge, 1900 – Guatemala, Costa Rica
C. pilosus Franganillo, 1930 – Cuba
C. pogonias Thorell, 1899 – Cameroon
C. potteri Simon, 1901 – Ethiopia, Equatorial Guinea (Bioko)
C. pulchriventris (Simon, 1897) – Zimbabwe, South Africa
C. racenisi Caporiacco, 1955 – Venezuela
C. ramosi Alayón, 2002 – Cuba
C. ravidus (Simon, 1886) – Argentina
C. rectipes F. O. Pickard-Cambridge, 1897 – Brazil, Guyana
C. renivulvatus Strand, 1906 – Ghana
C. rivulatus Pocock, 1900 – Cameroon, Gabon
C. rubripes Keyserling, 1881 – Panama, Ecuador
C. rwandanus Benoit, 1981 – Rwanda
C. saltensis Strand, 1909 – Argentina, Bolivia
C. satanas Strand, 1909 – Ecuador
C. serratipes F. O. Pickard-Cambridge, 1897 – Venezuela, Guyana, Brazil
C. serrichelis Mello-Leitão, 1922 – Brazil
C. sexmaculatus Roewer, 1961 – Senegal
C. siankaan Alayón, 2002 – Mexico
C. sigma (Schenkel, 1953) – Venezuela
C. silvaticus Benoit, 1981 – Congo
C. similis F. O. Pickard-Cambridge, 1897 – Brazil
C. somaliensis Benoit, 1979 – Somalia
C. spectabilis Lessert, 1921 – DR Congo, Uganda, Tanzania, South Africa
C. spiculus F. O. Pickard-Cambridge, 1897 – Colombia
C. spiralis F. O. Pickard-Cambridge, 1900 – Costa Rica
C. supinus F. O. Pickard-Cambridge, 1900 – Costa Rica
C. tenuipes Denis, 1955 – Guinea
C. torvus Pavesi, 1883 – Ethiopia
C. transvaalensis Benoit, 1981 – South Africa
C. trinidensis (Alayón, 2001) – Trinidad
C. uluguruensis Benoit, 1979 – Tanzania
C. undulatus Steyn & Van der Donckt, 2003 – Ivory Coast
C. unilineatus Simon, 1898 – St. Vincent
C. vagus Blackwall, 1866 – West Africa
C. validus Denis, 1955 – Guinea
C. valverdiensis Peck, 1981 – USA
C. vatovae Caporiacco, 1940 – Ethiopia
C. vehemens Keyserling, 1891 – Brazil
C. vespertilio Mello-Leitão, 1941 – Colombia
C. villasboasi Mello-Leitão, 1949 – Colombia, Ecuador, Brazil
C. vividus Blackwall, 1865 – Central Africa
C. w-notatus Petrunkevitch, 1925 – Panama
C. walckenaeri Griffith, 1833 – possibly South America

References

Araneomorphae genera
Cosmopolitan spiders
Ctenidae
Taxa named by Charles Athanase Walckenaer